The 1992–93 NBA season was the Detroit Pistons' 45th season in the National Basketball Association, and 36th season in the city of Detroit. During the off-season, the Pistons signed free agent Terry Mills, and acquired Olden Polynice from the Los Angeles Clippers. Under new head coach Ron Rothstein, the Pistons years of battle would catch up with them as they lost nine of their first eleven games. However, they would win ten of their next eleven games to climb back into playoff connection, but then slip below .500 holding a 21–29 record at the All-Star break. At midseason, the team traded Orlando Woolridge to the Milwaukee Bucks in exchange for All-Star guard Alvin Robertson. After posting many winning and losing streaks throughout the entire season, the Pistons missed the playoffs for the first time in ten years, finishing sixth in the Central Division with a 40–42 record.

Joe Dumars led the team in scoring averaging 23.5 points per game, and was named to the All-NBA Second Team, while Isiah Thomas provided the team with 17.6 points, 8.5 assists and 1.6 steals per game. In addition, Mills averaged 14.8 points and 5.8 rebounds per game, while Mark Aguirre contributed 9.9 points per game off the bench, but played just 51 games due to injuries and weight problems, and Dennis Rodman averaged 7.5 points, and led the league with 18.3 rebounds per game. Dumars and Thomas were both selected for the 1993 NBA All-Star Game, which would be Thomas's final All-Star appearance, and Dumars and Rodman were both named to the NBA All-Defensive First Team. Rodman also finished in fourth place in Defensive Player of the Year voting.

However, Rodman's bizarre behavior off the court was a great concern as he was involved in several off the court incidents, including a suicide attempt. Following the season, he was traded to the San Antonio Spurs after seven seasons in Detroit, while Aguirre signed as a free agent with the Los Angeles Clippers, and Rothstein was fired as head coach.

Draft picks

Roster

Regular season

Season standings

z - clinched division title
y - clinched division title
x - clinched playoff spot

Record vs. opponents

Game log

Player statistics

Player Statistics Citation:

Awards and records
Joe Dumars, All-NBA Second Team
Joe Dumars, NBA All-Defensive First Team
Dennis Rodman, NBA All-Defensive First Team

Transactions

References

Detroit Pistons seasons
Detroit
Detroit
Detroit